Bailey McKnight was a Canadian bicycle racer, who raced with the H&R Block Pro Cycling team. Bailey was known for his unpredictable attacks, strong sprint finishes, and aggressive time trial position. A career highlight for Bailey was being selected as the 31st alternate for the 2016 Rio Olympic Games. After 5 years, Bailey put away his dirty kit and settled down. As of 2016 he is married and working at 4iiii Innovations.

References

1990 births
Living people
Canadian male cyclists
Cyclists from Alberta
Sportspeople from Calgary